Woodland is a community in Hennepin County, Minnesota, United States, with lake shore property on Lake Minnetonka.  The population was 437 at the 2010 census. The first settlers arrived in 1857, when Woodland was part of Minnetonka Township. The land was formally platted in 1882 and developed through the 1890s. Woodland was incorporated as the independent village of Maplewoods in December 1948. It was renamed "Woodland" in 1949.

Geography
County 101 serves as a main route.

Demographics

2010 census
As of the census of 2010, there were 437 people, 169 households, and 138 families living in the city. The racial makeup of the city was 98.2% White, 0.2% African American, 0.5% Asian, 0.2% from other races, and 0.9% from two or more races. Hispanic or Latino of any race were 2.3% of the population.

There were 169 households, of which 29.6% had children under the age of 18 living with them, 74.6% were married couples living together, 4.7% had a female householder with no husband present, 2.4% had a male householder with no wife present, and 18.3% were non-families. 16.0% of all households were made up of individuals, and 7.1% had someone living alone who was 65 years of age or older. The average household size was 2.59 and the average family size was 2.89.

The median age in the city was 51.8 years. 22.9% of residents were under the age of 18; 4.9% were between the ages of 18 and 24; 11.4% were from 25 to 44; 41.9% were from 45 to 64; and 18.8% were 65 years of age or older. The gender makeup of the city was 49.7% male and 50.3% female.

2000 census
As of the census of 2000, there were 480 people, 173 households, and 144 families living in the city. The racial makeup of the city was 97.71% White, 0.42% Asian, 0.62% from other races, and 1.25% from two or more races. Hispanic or Latino of any race were 1.04% of the population.

There were 173 households, out of which 38.7% had children under the age of 18 living with them, 76.3% were married couples living together, 5.8% had a female householder with no husband present, and 16.2% were non-families. 13.3% of all households were made up of individuals, and 4.0% had someone living alone who was 65 years of age or older.  The average household size was 2.77 and the average family size was 3.06.

In the city, the population was spread out, with 28.1% under the age of 18, 5.0% from 18 to 24, 18.3% from 25 to 44, 36.7% from 45 to 64, and 11.9% who were 65 years of age or older.  The median age was 44 years. For every 100 females, there were 92.8 males.  For every 100 females age 18 and over, there were 93.8 males.

The median income for a household in the city was $153,881, and the median income for a family was $175,000. Males had a median income of $100,000 versus $46,250 for females. The per capita income for the city was $95,495.  About 3.8% of families and 4.6% of the population were below the poverty line, including 6.4% of those under age 18 and none of those age 65 or over.

Politics

References

Cities in Hennepin County, Minnesota
Cities in Minnesota
Populated places established in 1948

es:Wood Lake (Minnesota)